Thayeria obliqua is a freshwater fish in the family Characidae of the order Characiformes. It is a tropical fish. It resides in the basin of the Tocantins River and Guaporé River in Brazil.

References

Characidae
Fish of the Tocantins River basin
Fish described in 1908
Taxa named by Carl H. Eigenmann